Diamantis Chouchoumis (born 17 July 1994) is a Greek professional footballer who plays as a left-back for Super League club Panetolikos.

Club career
On 29 October 2012, during a Superleague match against OFI Crete, he made his official debut for the men's team with Panathinaikos. He plays as left back and comes from the club's youth ranks. On 22 December 2014 he scored his first goal for Panathinaikos against Kerkyra. On 1 April 2014, he signed a new contract with Panathinaikos till 2018.

On 29 July 2017, Slovan Bratislava officially announced the signing of Chouchoumis on a one-year contract for an undisclosed fee, as the 23-year-old player was not in the season plans of Greek manager of The Greens, Marinos Ouzounidis.

On 11 July 2018, Chouchoumis signed a two-year-deal with the Serbian club Vojvodina Novi Sad. On 25 February 2019, Chouchoumis and Vojvodina mutually terminated the contract.

On 10 July 2019, he joined Apollon Smyrnis on a free transfer.

International career
After becoming a frequent presence in the calls of the Greek U19 team since 2011, in 2015, when he made 21 years if age, he debuted for the Greek U21 team.

Career statistics

Honours
Panathinaikos
 Greek Cup: 2014

Slovan Bratislava
 Slovak Cup: 2018

References

External links
Diamantis Chouchoumis at Panathinaikos FC website 

1994 births
Living people
Greek footballers
Greece youth international footballers
Greek expatriate footballers
Association football fullbacks
Panathinaikos F.C. players
ŠK Slovan Bratislava players
FK Vojvodina players
Apollon Smyrnis F.C. players
Panetolikos F.C. players
Super League Greece players
Slovak Super Liga players
Serbian SuperLiga players
Super League Greece 2 players
Expatriate footballers in Slovakia
Expatriate footballers in Serbia
Greek expatriate sportspeople in Serbia
Greek expatriate sportspeople in Slovakia
People from Euboea (regional unit)
Footballers from Central Greece